Piero Toci (born 29 June 1949) is an Italian former professional tennis player.

Toci, who comes from Tuscany, was an Italian under 16s singles champion. 

While competing on the international tour he had one of his best results in 1968 when he beat Manuel Orantes at the South Australian Championships, saving a match point en route. He made the second round of the 1969 Australian Open, with a five-set win over Giuseppe Merlo.

References

External links
 
 

1949 births
Living people
Italian male tennis players
Sportspeople from the Province of Pistoia
20th-century Italian people